, also known as , was the second legendary emperor of Japan according to the traditional order of succession. Very little is known about this Emperor due to a lack of material available for further verification and study. Suizei is known as a "legendary emperor" among historians as his actual existence is disputed. A legendary account from the Kojiki states that Suizei became emperor after receiving the title of crown prince by his half brother due to his bravery regarding a murder plot. Suizei's reign started in 581 BC, he had one wife and a sole son who supposedly became the next emperor upon his death in 549 BC.

Legendary narrative 
While the Kojiki provides little information about Suizei, it does state his name, genealogy, and a record about his accession to the throne. He was born sometime in 632 BC, and was one of the sons of Emperor Jimmu and his chief wife Himetataraisuzu-hime. The account in the Kojiki states that Suizei's older brother Kamuyaimimi was originally the Crown-prince. When Jimmu died, another of his sons named Tagishimimi attempted to seize the throne by murdering those in his way. Tagishimimi was given birth to by a lesser wife named Ahiratsu-hime, and was older than Jimmu's legitimate heir. When Himetataraisuzu-hime learned of the plot she tried in vain to warn her sons by way of songs and poems. While Suizei encouraged Kamuyaimimi to slay Tagishimimi, he could not find it in him to murder his own half brother. Suizei pleaded with his older brother for the weapon he was going to use, and upon receiving it accomplished the deed for him. Kamuyawimimi ceded his rights as crown prince shortly after to Suizei as he believed his braver younger brother should be the new Emperor.

While another more expansive account exists in the Nihon Shoki, the section is more steeped in myth. Suizei is conventionally considered to have reigned from 581 to 549 BC. He wed  at an unknown date, and the two had one son. Emperor Suizei allegedly died in 549 BC and his gravesite is formally named Tsukida no oka no e no misasagi. He was succeeded by his only son, Prince Shikitsuhikotamatemi who became Emperor Annei.

Known information
The existence of at least the first nine Emperors is disputed due to insufficient material available for further verification and study. Suizei is thus regarded by historians as a "legendary Emperor", and is ranked as the first of eight Emperors without specific legends associated with them. The name Suizei-tennō was assigned to him posthumously by later generations, and literally means "joyfully healthy peace". His name might have been regularized centuries after the lifetime ascribed to Suizei, possibly during the time in which legends about the origins of the Yamato dynasty were compiled as the chronicles known today as the Kojiki. While the actual site of his grave is not known, an Imperial misasagi or tomb for Suizei is currently maintained in Kashihara. The first emperor that historians state might have actually existed is Emperor Sujin, the 10th emperor of Japan. Outside of the Kojiki, the reign of Emperor Kinmei ( – 571 AD) is the first for which contemporary historiography is able to assign verifiable dates. The conventionally accepted names and dates of the early Emperors were not confirmed as "traditional" though, until the reign of Emperor Kanmu between 737 and 806 AD.

Consorts and children
Empress: , Kotoshironushi's daughter
, later Emperor Annei

See also
 Emperor of Japan
 List of Emperors of Japan
 Imperial cult

Notes

References

Further reading
 Aston, William George. (1896).  Nihongi: Chronicles of Japan from the Earliest Times to A.D. 697. London: Kegan Paul, Trench, Trubner. 
 Brown, Delmer M. and Ichirō Ishida, eds. (1979).  Gukanshō: The Future and the Past. Berkeley: University of California Press. ; 
 Chamberlain, Basil Hall. (1920). The Kojiki. Read before the Asiatic Society of Japan on April 12, May 10, and June 21, 1882; reprinted, May, 1919. 
 Nussbaum, Louis-Frédéric and Käthe Roth. (2005).  Japan encyclopedia. Cambridge: Harvard University Press. ; 
 Ponsonby-Fane, Richard Arthur Brabazon. (1959).  The Imperial House of Japan. Kyoto: Ponsonby Memorial Society. 
 Titsingh, Isaac. (1834). Nihon Ōdai Ichiran; ou,  Annales des empereurs du Japon.  Paris: Royal Asiatic Society, Oriental Translation Fund of Great Britain and Ireland. 
 Varley, H. Paul. (1980).  Jinnō Shōtōki: A Chronicle of Gods and Sovereigns. New York: Columbia University Press. ; 

 
 

Legendary Emperors of Japan
People of Jōmon-period Japan